Gene Dante and The Future Starlets is the self-titled debut EP by Gene Dante and The Future Starlets released in January 2006 on Surreal Records/Multimedia.  The album was produced and recorded by Richard Marr in Allston, Massachusetts at Galaxy Park Studios.

Track listing
 Little Belle
 A Madness to his Method
 The Crack in Your Glass Slipper
 Beautiful Drag
 In Lieu of an Overture
 Spaceager
 Ad Frank vs. Neil Diamond
 Chaser

Personnel
 Gene Dante: vocals and guitar
 Dark Mark White: upright bass and vocals
 Eddie Nowik: guitars
 Cutty: drums and vocals

Additional musicians and instruments
 Patti Linnett-Tuttle: vocals

Production
 Producer: Richard Marr
 Music and lyrics: Gene Dante
 Recorded at Galaxy Park Studios, Allston, MA
 Mastering: Jeff Lipton (Peerless Mastering)

Graphics
 Art direction and design: Dante Ferrarini (Kosa Minore Creative)
 Photos: Liz Linder

References

2006 EPs